Spas Ivanov Georgiev (born 21 June 1992) is a Bulgarian professional footballer who plays as a midfielder for Beroe Stara Zagora.

External links
 
 
 

1992 births
Living people
Bulgarian footballers
Association football midfielders
First Professional Football League (Bulgaria) players
PFC Slavia Sofia players
FC Montana players
PFC Dobrudzha Dobrich players
Livingston F.C. players
Albion Rovers F.C. players
FC Dunav Ruse players
FC Botev Vratsa players
FC CSKA 1948 Sofia players
FC Septemvri Sofia players
OFC Pirin Blagoevgrad players
Bulgarian expatriate footballers
Expatriate footballers in Scotland
Bulgarian expatriate sportspeople in Scotland
Scottish Professional Football League players
Sportspeople from Stara Zagora